Probable rRNA-processing protein EBP2 is a protein that in humans is encoded by the EBNA1BP2 gene.

Interactions
EBNA1BP2 has been shown to interact with FGF3.

References

Further reading